Billy Burke (born May 24, 1953) is an American Pentecostal healing evangelist and the president of his itinerant healing ministry, Billy Burke World Outreach, headquartered in Tampa, Florida.  Burke is also the senior pastor of the Miracle Center World Outreach in Tampa.  His healing ministry is founded on his testimony of being healed of terminal brain cancer when he was 9 years old.

Life and career 
Billy Burke was born in Greensburg, Pennsylvania. When he was 9 years old, Burke was diagnosed with terminal brain cancer. After undergoing an unsuccessful operation that left him partially paralyzed, and given three days to live, his grandmother removed him from the hospital against doctors orders. Her goal was to bring him to a Kathryn Kuhlman healing service at the First Presbyterian Church in Pittsburgh, Pennsylvania. Burke says that while at this service Ms. Kuhlman touched him, allegedly healing him from cancer which has never returned.

Then at the age of 19, Burke’s younger brother was killed by a drunk driver. This devastated him and he began to search for the reason of why he was spared from a horrible disease. He was miraculously healed and yet his younger brother was taken. It was then that he was called back to another Kathryn Kuhlman service in Youngstown, Ohio. From there he decided to enter the ministry and attended Melodyland School of Theology in Anaheim, California.

After graduating from Melodyland School of Theology, Burke returned to Pittsburgh and started his ministry in Northeast. In 1989, Burke moved his ministry to Tampa. In 1995, he founded the Miracle Center World Outreach.  Since then he has traveled all over the United States and the world, spreading God's message of healing and faith. In 2009, Burke shared his testimony on Sid Roth's "It's Supernatural".

References

External links 
 Billy Burke World Outreach
 Kathryn Kuhlman

1953 births
Living people
American Pentecostal pastors
American television evangelists
American faith healers
Christian miracles